Dodge v. Ford Motor Company, 204 Mich. 459, 170 N.W. 668 (Mich. 1919) is a case in which the Michigan Supreme Court held that Henry Ford had to operate the Ford Motor Company in the interests of its shareholders, rather than in a charitable manner for the benefit of his employees or customers. It is often taught as affirming the principle of "shareholder primacy" in corporate America, although that teaching has received some criticism. At the same time, the case affirmed the business judgment rule, leaving Ford an extremely wide latitude about how to run the company.

The general legal position today (except in Delaware, the jurisdiction where over half of all U.S. public companies are domiciled and where shareholder primacy is still upheld) is that the business judgment that directors may exercise is expansive. Management decisions will not be challenged where one can point to any rational link to benefiting the corporation as a whole.

Facts

By 1916, the Ford Motor Company had accumulated a capital surplus of $60 million. The price of the Model T, Ford's mainstay product, had been successively cut over the years while the wages of the workers had dramatically, and quite publicly, increased. The company's president and majority stockholder, Henry Ford, sought to end special dividends for shareholders in favor of massive investments in new plants that would enable Ford to dramatically increase production, and the number of people employed at his plants, while continuing to cut the costs and prices of his cars. In public defense of this strategy, Ford declared:

While Ford may have believed that such a strategy might be in the long-term benefit of the company, he told his fellow shareholders that the value of this strategy to them was not a main consideration in his plans. The minority shareholders objected to this strategy, demanding that Ford stop reducing his prices when they could barely fill orders for cars and to continue to pay out special dividends from the capital surplus in lieu of his proposed plant investments. Two brothers, John Francis Dodge and Horace Elgin Dodge, owned 10% of the company, among the largest shareholders next to Ford.

The Court was called upon to decide whether the minority shareholders could prevent Ford from operating the company for the charitable ends that he had declared.

Judgment
The Michigan Supreme Court held that Henry Ford could not lower consumer prices and raise employee salaries.

Notably, obiter dicta in the opinion written by Russell C. Ostrander argued that the profits to the stockholders should be the primary concern for the company directors. Because this company was in business for profit, Ford could not turn it into a charity. This was compared to a spoliation of the company's assets. The court therefore upheld the order of the trial court requiring that directors declare an extra dividend of $19.3 million. It said the following:

Significance

As a direct result of this decision, Henry Ford threatened to set up a competing manufacturer as a way to finally compel his adversaries to sell back their shares to him. Subsequently, the money that the Dodge brothers received from the case would be used to expand the Dodge Brothers Company.

Ford was also motivated by a desire to squeeze out his minority shareholders, especially the Dodge brothers, whom he suspected (correctly) of using their Ford dividends to build a rival car company. By cutting off their dividends, Ford hoped to starve the Dodges of capital to fuel their growth. In that context, the Dodge decision is viewed as a mixed result for both sides of the dispute. Ford was denied the ability to arbitrarily undermine the profitability of the firm, and thereby eliminate future dividends. Under the upheld business judgment rule, however, Ford was given considerable leeway via control of his board about what investments he could make. That left him with considerable influence over dividends, but not complete control as he wished.

This case is frequently cited as support for the idea that corporate law requires boards of directors to maximize shareholder wealth. However, one view is that this interpretation has not represented the law in most states for some time.

However, others, while agreeing that the case did not invent the idea of shareholder wealth maximization, found that it was an accurate statement of the law, in that "corporate officers and directors have a duty to manage the corporation for the purpose of maximizing profits for the benefit of shareholders" is a default legal rule, and that the reason that "Dodge v. Ford is a rule that is hardly ever enforced by courts" is not that it represents bad case law, but because the business judgement rule means:

See also
 Benefit corporation
 Corporate social responsibility
 Grimshaw v. Ford Motor Co.
 Shareholder primacy
 US corporate law

Citations 

1919 in Michigan
1919 in United States case law
Ford Motor Company
Michigan state case law
United States corporate case law